The Ranganathaswamy temple, also rendered the Sri Ranganathaswamy temple, in Srirangapatna, in the Mandya district of Karnataka state, India, is dedicated to the Hindu god Ranganatha (a manifestation of the god Vishnu). It is one of the five important pilgrimage sites of Sri Vaishnavism along the river Kaveri for devotees of Ranganatha. These five sacred sites are together known as Pancharanga Kshetrams in South India. Since Srirangapatna is the first temple starting from upstream, the deity is known as Adi Ranga (lit; "first Ranga"). The town of Srirangapatna, which derives its name from the temple, is located on an island in the river Kaveri.

History 
According to the Archaeological Survey of India (ASI), the temple is one of considerable antiquity. An inscription at the temple reveals it was first consecrated in 984 CE by a local chief called Tirumalaiah, a vassal of the Western Ganga dynasty. In the early 12th century, Hoysala King Vishnuvardhana (r.1108-1152) granted the village of Srirangapatna to the Vaishnava saint Ramanujacharya as an agraharam (place of learning). An inscription of the great Hoysala King Veera Ballala II (1210 CE) confirms that additions and renovations were made to the temple at that time. The tower over the entrance bears features consistent with Vijayanagara architecture. According to historian George Michell, contributions were also made by the Wodeyar kings of the Kingdom of Mysore. The temple is just 400 metres away from Tipu palace.  The temple is protected by the Archaeological Survey of India as a monument of national importance. According to historian K.V. Soundararajan, the Ranganatha temples in South India built during the 9th and 10th centuries have a systematic arrangement of subsidiary deities as seen in this temple along with the Appakkudathaan Perumal Temple at Koviladi, Sowmya Narayana Perumal temple at Thirukoshtiyur, Veeraraghava Perumal Temple at Thiruevvul and Rajagopalaswamy temple at Mannargudi.

Legend 
As per the Hindu legend, Gautama Maharishi had performed severe penance in this place in order to view Maha Vishnu in reclining position . Lord Vishnu portrayed him self as Ranganathaswamy in this place. Gautama Maharishi asked him to stay here for ever, so that devotees can pray this lord in the upcoming ages.

Temple plan 
The temple has an imposing tower over the entrance gate (gopura) and two large concentric rectangular enclosures (prakara) around its perimeter. The entrance to the inner sanctum (garbhagriha) is through multiple columned halls (mantapa). A vestibule (sukhanasi), hall (navaranga or just mantapa) and a front hall (mukhamantapa) are the other main structures in the temple. The roof of the mukhamantapa is decorated with a "garland" ("hara") of miniature decorative towers (called "kudu" and "sala" shikharas) whose niches contain stucco images of the god Vishnu.

In the sanctum, the image of Vishnu reclines on the coils of the snake Adisesha, under a canopy formed by the snake's seven hoods, with his consort Lakshmi at his feet. Flanking Vishnu are other deities from the Hindu pantheon; Sridevi, Bhudevi (goddess of earth) and Brahma (the creator). There are other smaller shrines within the complex dedicated to Narasimha (an avatar of Vishnu), Gopalakrishna, Srinivasa (manifestation of Vishnu), Hanuman, Garuda and the Alwar saints.

The Three sacred sites for Smartha -BaboorKamme  & Sri Vaishnava Sects of South India, Both Adi Shankara and Ramanujacharya has visited and glorified the deities in their Hymns. The following temples are considered the five sacred sites of worship of the god Ranganatha and are together called Pancharanga Kshetram (Pancha-"five", ranga-"Ranganatha", Kshetram-"sites").

Gallery

See also 
Vaishnavism
Divya Desams
Pancharanga Kshetrams

Notes

References

External links 

Hindu temples in Mandya district
13th-century Hindu temples
Abhimana temples of Vishnu
Srirangapatna
Vishnu temples